Eva Pölzing or Poelzing is a German singer who is best known as the former female vocalist for  Blutengel.

Music career
Pölzing joined that band early 2002 to replace Gini Martin and stayed the better part of 3 almost 4 years. Her first release with Blutengel was Angel Dust. She sang on three tracks; "Angel of the Night", "Wonderland" and "Keine Ewigkeit" (with Constance Rudert and Chris Pohl).

In the Demon Kiss album, she sang the following tracks: "Angels of the Dark", "Silent Tears (For You)", "In the Distance", "Senseless Life", "Go to Hell?" and "Falscher Stolz". In 2005, after the release of the DVD "Live Lines" Eva decided to leave the band for personal reasons and mostly because the lack of time because she was working on her education and it conflicted with tour schedules, Eva has been replaced by the former Say-Y singer, Ulrike Goldmann. Her last concert was at the 2005 Amphi Festival in Köln Germany. Since 2007, she joined F.O.D as a session singer and then became a full-time member of the band known for her live rendition of Blutengel "Seelenschmerz" (originally sang by Gini Martin) which was her primary crowd pleaser onward from 2003 while still a member of Blutengel, as well as appearing on stage and album works with other bands such as Battle Scream and Solitary Experiments with much positive feedback.

Discography

With F.O.D
 2008: Synthesizer TanzMusik – Album
 2010: Maschinentanz – Album

With Blutengel
 2002: Angel Dust – Album
 2002: Angel Dust Limited Box Edition – Album
 2002: Fear Section Vol.1: "Blutengel - Weg Zu Mir (Schicksalsversion 2002)" – Compilation track
 2004: No Eternity – Single
 2004: Demon Kiss – Album
 2004: Demon Kiss Limited Box Edition – Album
 2005: Live Lines – DVD

Guest appearances
 2004: Nik Page: Sin Machine – Album
→ Vocals on "Bad Karma" and "Sweet Dust"
 2007: Battle Scream: Stalker – Album
→ Vocals on "Dying Love"

External links
  Blutengel's Official website

German women singers
Year of birth missing (living people)
Living people